Content Disarm & Reconstruction (CDR) is a computer security technology for removing potentially malicious code from files. Unlike malware analysis, CDR technology does not determine or detect malware's functionality but removes all file components that are not approved within the system's definitions and policies.

It is used to prevent cyber security threats from entering a corporate network perimeter. Channels that CDR can be used to protect include email and website traffic. Advanced solutions can also provide similar protection on computer endpoints, or cloud email and file sharing services.

There are three levels of CDR; 1) flattening and converting the original file to a PDF, 2) stripping active content while keeping the original file type, and 3) eliminating all file-borne risk while maintaining file type, integrity and active content. Beyond these three levels, there are also more advanced forms of CDR that is able to perform "soft conversion" and "hard conversion", based on the user's preference in balancing usability and security.

Applications 

CDR works by processing all incoming files of an enterprise network, deconstructing them, and removing the elements that do not match the file type's standards or set policies. CDR technology then rebuilds the files into clean versions that can be sent on to end users as intended.

Because CDR removes all potentially malicious code, it can be effective against zero-day vulnerabilities that rely on being an unknown threat that other security technologies would need to patch against to maintain protection.

CDR can be used to prevent cyber threats from variety of sources:

 Email
 Data Diodes
 Web Browsers
 Endpoints
 File Servers
 FTP
 Cloud email or webmail programs
 SMB/CIFS
 Removable media scanning (CDR Kiosk)
CDR can be applied to a variety of file formats including:

 Images
 Office documents
 PDF
 Audio/video file formats
 Archives
 HTML

Commercial availability 

CDR or similar file sanitization technology is commercially available from a number of companies (sorted A-Z): 

 Bodyguard (CDR for desktop), The Netherlands, a cyber security company established in 2021.
 Check Point (Threat Extraction), Israel, a global company established in 1993.
 Clearswift (Structural Sanitization), a UK based Cyber Security provider.
Deep Secure (Content Threat Removal - CTR), a UK based Cyber Security provider. Acquired by Forcepoint in 2021.
Forcepoint, USA, provides Defense-Grade CDR and Cross Domain Solutions for Large Enterprises, Critical Infrastructure and Governments for 25 years. 
Fortinet, USA, founded in 2000 and headquartered in Sunnyvale, California, with offices around the globe.
 GateScanner CDR by Sasa Software, Israel with offices in the US and Singapore.
 Glasswall is a British cybersecurity firm that offers instant protection against file-based threats with CDR technology. Founded in 2005. 
 Jiransecurity, South Korea, a highly-specialized Security SW company established in 2014.
 ReSec Technologies, Israel, Established in 2012. 
OPSWAT, USA, a global cyber-security company founded in 2002 with offices in North America, Europe, and Asia.
 Softcamp, a South Korean information security company established in 1999 headquartered in South Korea with offices in Japan.
 Votiro (Secure File Gateway, Level 3 CDR), a global cyber-security company established in 2010 with offices in North America, Europe, and Asia.
 YazamTech, CDR Technology, small Israeli startup , established in 2008.
 ODIX (ODI) Israel, a malware prevention and deep file inspection solutions company established in 2012.

Open Source Implementations 
 DocBleach
 ExeFilter

See also 

 Advanced persistent threat
 Computer security
 Cyber threats
 Deep Content Inspection
 Internet security
 Content Threat Removal

References 

Computer security
Cloud computing